Jorge Cárdenas may refer to:

Jorge de Cárdenas y Manrique de Lara, 4th Duke of Maqueda (1584–1644), Spanish military leader and statesman
Jorge de Cárdenas (born 1933), Cuban Olympic sailor in 1952, 1956 and 1960
Jorge Godoy Cárdenas (born 1954), Mexican legislator with Citizens' Movement
Jorge Luis Mendoza Cárdenas, Mexican leader of 2000s and 2010s criminal cartel, a/k/a La Garra
Jorge Cárdenas (weightlifter) (born 1997), Mexican Summer Olympian in 2020